According to Hindu theology, there are five sacred lakes; collectively called the Panch Sarovar or Panch-Sarovar: Mansarovar, Bindu Sarovar, Narayan Sarovar, Pampa Sarovar and Pushkar Sarovar. They are also mentioned in Shrimad Bhagavata Purana. Four of the lakes are in India, while Manasarovar is in Tibet.

References

Lists of lakes of India
Hindu pilgrimage sites in India
Hindu pilgrimage sites in China
Sacred lakes of India